Pierre Bouysse is a French former professional football player.

Bouysse began playing youth and amateur football as a goalkeeper with Aurillac FCA. He has played professionally in Ligue 2 for FC Gueugnon, CS Sedan Ardennes and Clermont Foot.

References 

Living people
French footballers
Ligue 2 players
FC Gueugnon players
CS Sedan Ardennes players
Clermont Foot players
FC Aurillac Arpajon Cantal Auvergne players
Association football goalkeepers
Year of birth missing (living people)